The 2017–18 Albanian Superliga was the 79th official season, or 82nd season of top-tier football in Albania (including three unofficial championships during World War II) and the 18th season under the name Kategoria Superiore. The season began on 9 September 2017 and ended on 18 May 2018. Title record-holders KF Tirana did not participate in the top flight for the first time since competition's foundation. Kukësi are the defending champions. Skënderbeu, won the league title on 9 May 2018 with 3 matches to spare.

Since Skënderbeu is banned from UEFA competitions, the runners-up of this season's Superliga earned a place in the first qualifying round of the 2018−19 Champions League, with the third and fourth placed clubs earning a place in the first qualifying round of the 2018−19 Europa League.

Teams
Two clubs earned promotion from the Kategoria e Parë, Kamza and Lushnja, and joined the Superliga this season. Korabi Peshkopi and Tirana were relegated at the conclusion of last season.

Locations

Stadiums

Personnel and kits

Note: Flags indicate national team as has been defined under FIFA eligibility rules. Players and Managers may hold more than one non-FIFA nationality.

Managerial changes

League table

Results
Clubs will play each other four times for a total of 36 matches each.

First half of season

Second half of season

Season statistics

Scoring

Top scorers

Hat-tricks

Note
4 Player scored 4 goals; (H) – Home ; (A) – Away

Clean sheets

Discipline

Most yellow cards: 11
 Taulant Sefgjinaj (Laçi)

Most red cards: 2
 Taulant Sefgjinaj (Laçi)
 Ditmar Bicaj (Vllaznia)

See also
 Albanian Superliga

References

External links
 
Superliga at uefa.com

2017–18
2017–18 in European association football leagues
1